ATP-binding cassette sub-family F member 1 is a protein that in humans is encoded by the ABCF1 gene.

The protein encoded by this gene is a member of the superfamily of ATP-binding cassette (ABC) transporters. ABC proteins transport various molecules across extra- and intra-cellular membranes. ABC genes are divided into seven distinct subfamilies (ABC1, MDR/TAP, MRP, ALD, OABP, GCN20, White). This protein is a member of the GCN20 subfamily. Unlike other members of the superfamily, this protein lacks the transmembrane domains which are characteristic of most ABC transporters. This protein may be regulated by tumor necrosis factor-alpha and play a role in enhancement of protein synthesis and the inflammation process.

See also
 ATP-binding cassette transporter

References

Further reading

External links 
 
 

ATP-binding cassette transporters